Commendable (April 13, 1997 – April 10, 2014) was an American Thoroughbred racehorse, best known for his victory in the 2000 Belmont Stakes. In his racing career, he ran twelve times and won two races. After his racing career, he stood as a stallion in South Korea.

Background
Commendable, a chestnut horse with a white blaze and four white feet, was sired by Gone West out of the mare Bought Twice, a half sister of the successful racehorse and sire Fappiano. As a yearling, he was consigned to the Keeneland July sales by the Taylor Made Agency, where he was bought for $575,000 by Robert and Beverly Lewis.

Racing career

1999: two-year-old season
Prior to the Belmont Stakes, Commendable earned $88,470 in seven races and his only win came in August 1999 in his debut: a Del Mar maiden race for two-year-olds. In his only other start at age two, he finished fourth in the Del Mar Futurity a month later. Despite his modest achievements in 1999, he was identified as a potential contender for the Triple Crown races by his trainer, D. Wayne Lukas.

2000: three-year-old season
In 2000, Commendable lost four races leading up to the Triple Crown series, although he finished fourth in the San Felipe Stakes to Fusaichi Pegasus and the San Rafael Stakes to War Chant. In the Kentucky Derby, he finished seventeenth in a nineteen-horse field, after which his handlers chose not to run him in the Preakness Stakes.

On a sweltering day at Belmont, Commendable was among the outsiders for the third leg of the Triple Crown, despite the absence of leading three-year-olds Fusaichi Pegasus and Red Bullet. Lukas observed that he would need "a career best" to win. Ridden by Pat Day, Commendable raced prominently, took the lead half a mile from the finish and stayed on in the straight to hold off the 9/5 favorite Aptitude by a length and a half. The 67,000 crowd were reportedly stunned by the Commendable's win which was achieved in a slow time of 2:31.2.

Following his Belmont win, Commendable finished fourth in the Dwyer Stakes and then finished eighth of the nine starters in the Haskell Invitational Handicap. He later took third in the Travers Stakes and second behind Tiznow in the Super Derby. Commendable did not race again, and his retirement was announced in November.

Stud record
He was retired to stud duty at Mill Ridge Farm in Lexington, Kentucky, where he remained until January 2005. He was then sold to the Korea Racing Association and exported to stand at a stud on Jeju Island, South Korea.

Death
Commendable died on April 10, 2014, of complications of colic. His death at the Jangsu Stud Farm in Jeolla, South Korea was confirmed in June 2014.

Pedigree

References

1997 racehorse births
2014 racehorse deaths
Racehorses bred in Kentucky
Racehorses trained in the United States
Belmont Stakes winners
Thoroughbred family 16-a